Leyrer is a surname. Notable people with the surname include:

Edith Leyrer (born 1946), Austrian actress
Marcus Leyrer (1929–2017), Austrian fencer

See also
Lehrer
Lerer